Kwame Baah (born 21 April 1998, in Accra) is a Ghanaian footballer who plays as a goalkeeper for Asante Kotoko in the Ghanaian Premier League.

Career
Kwame Baah made his debut in Ghanaian professional football during the 2015 season with Heart of Lions F.C. in the Ghanaian Division One. He was picked up by Inter Allies FC from Heart of Lions by the end of the 2015 season, having signed a three-year deal with the Premier League side. Baah made his debut for his new club in his first season (2016), during which he appeared in ten matches. He was named vice-captain of the team ahead of their 2017 season and sealed his place as their main goalkeeper.

In the summer 2019, Baah joined Asante Kotoko.

International career
Baah featured for Ghana U20 at the 2015 U20 African Cup of Nations, playing an important role in the match for the 3rd/4th place by stopping a penalty. Baah subsequently also received a call up for the 2015 FIFA U-20 World Cup, assuming the role of reserve goalkeeper for Ghana U20. Kwame featured in all four qualifier games played by Ghana U20 in the qualifiers for 2017 U20 African Cup of Nations.

Baah is part of the Ghana B-team, composed of local players, holding training camps ahead the 2017 WAFU Nations Cup and doubleheader in the 2018 African Nations Championship qualifiers.

Statistics 

Last update: July 8, 2017

References

See also
Football in Ghana

1998 births
Living people
Ghanaian footballers
People from Accra
Association football goalkeepers
Heart of Lions F.C. players
International Allies F.C. players
Asante Kotoko S.C. players
Ghana Premier League players